Marek Norbert Jackowski (December 11, 1946 – May 18, 2013) was a Polish rock musician, best known as a member of the rock band Maanam.

Discography 
 Solo albums

References

1946 births
2013 deaths
Polish rock musicians
Polish guitarists
Polish male guitarists
20th-century Polish musicians
21st-century Polish musicians
20th-century male musicians
21st-century male musicians
People from Olsztyn County